The 1980–81 Beta Ethniki season was 22nd edition of second tier nationwide championship of Greece. Forty teams participated in the league, divided in two groups, the South and the North Group. Iraklis was named champion of the North Group and got promoted to the Alpha Ethniki. In the South Group Egaleo and Rodos tied and a play-off match, that found Rodos victorious by a 1-0 scoreline, decided the team that was named champion of the South Group and got promoted to the Alpha Ethniki.

On the other hand, Pelopas Kiato, Olympiakos Neon Liosion, AO Patra and Panarkadikos got relegated to the C National Amateur Division from the South Group. Pandramaikos, Edessaikos, PO Elassona and Odysseas Kordeliou were the teams that got relegated from the North Group.

South Group

League table

Promotion play-off
The Promotion Play-off was played in Heraklion.

|}

North Group

League table

Top scorers

References

External links
RSSSF Greece Beta Ethniki 1980-81

Second level Greek football league seasons
Greece
2